The Homoeopathy Central Council Act, 1973, (Act 59 of 1973), is a now-repealed Act of the Parliament of India to primarily structure the role of the Central Council of Homoeopathy and to enable the regularization of the maintenance of a central register of issues and entities related to the field of homoeopathy. It included five chapters when it was initially passed. The Act was amended in 2002, and the amendment—Homoeopathy Central Council Amendment Act, 2002 (No. 51 of 2002)—was passed in December 2002. The Act was repealed and replaced by the National Commission for Homoeopathy Act, 2020 with effect from 7 October 2020.

Chapters
Chapter I: Contained the introduction to the Act and objectives intended to be achieved.
Chapter II: Contained the actual Central Council Act and the committees proposed to be formed.
Chapter III: Contained details of how institutions related to teaching streams like Ayurveda, Unani medicine, Siddhi and their associate medical qualifications could be recognised.
Chapter IV: Contained the national central register detailing various issues and entities connected with the area of homoeopathy.
Chapter V: Other issues of significance not mentioned directly within the previous chapters.

References

Homeopathy
Acts of the Parliament of India 1973
Health law in India